Najdi! (meaning "Find!") is a search engine specialized in Republic of Macedonia media content. Unlike most search engines, it does not utilize a spider to gather the content it indexes, but interfaces directly with the websites it covers through RSS or other XML, in combination with the SWISH-E open-source software.

Founded by IT expert Petar Kajevski, "Najdi!" quickly rose to prominence due to the volume of information it covers, and the specific upgrades of the software tailored for content in Macedonian. Besides content of news sites, "Najdi!" also features searches of Macedonian blogs, and printed books.

In 2005, "Najdi!" won the national competition and became the official candidate of Republic of Macedonia in the e-Inclusion category of the World Summit Award.

References

External links
Najdi! website

Domain-specific search engines
Mass media companies of North Macedonia